Death is frequently imagined as a personified force. In some mythologies, a character known as the Grim Reaper (usually depicted as a berobed skeleton wielding a scythe) causes the victim's death by coming to collect that person's soul. Other beliefs hold that the Spectre of Death is only a psychopomp, a benevolent figure who serves to gently sever the last ties between the soul and the body, and to guide the deceased to the afterlife, without having any control over when or how the victim dies. Death is most often personified in male form, although in certain cultures Death is perceived as female (for instance, Marzanna in Slavic mythology, or Santa Muerte in Mexico).
Death is also portrayed as one of the Four Horsemen of the Apocalypse.

By region

Americas

Latin America
As is the case in many Romance languages (including French, Portuguese, Italian, and Romanian), the Spanish word for death, muerte, is a feminine noun. As such, it is common in Spanish-speaking cultures to personify death as a female figure.

In Aztec mythology, Mictecacihuatl is the "Queen of Mictlan" (the Aztec underworld), ruling over the afterlife with her husband Mictlantecuhtli. Other epithets for her include "Lady of the Dead," as her role includes keeping watch over the bones of the dead. Mictecacihuatl was represented with a fleshless body and with jaw agape to swallow the stars during the day. She presided over the ancient festivals of the dead, which evolved from Aztec traditions into the modern Day of the Dead after synthesis with Spanish cultural traditions.

There was also the goddess of suicide, Ixtab. She was a minor goddess in the scale of Aztec mythology. She was also known as The Hangwoman as she came to help along those who had killed themselves.

Our Lady of the Holy Death (Santa Muerte) is a female deity or folk saint of Mexican folk religion, whose popularity has been growing in Mexico and the United States in recent years. Since the pre-Columbian era, Mexican culture has maintained a certain reverence towards death, as seen in the widespread commemoration of the Day of the Dead. La Calavera Catrina, a character symbolizing death, is also an icon of the Mexican Day of the Dead.

San La Muerte (Saint Death) is a skeletal folk saint venerated in Paraguay, northeast Argentina, and southern Brazil. As the result of internal migration in Argentina since the 1960s, the veneration of San La Muerte has been extended to Greater Buenos Aires and the national prison system as well. Saint Death is depicted as a male skeleton figure usually holding a scythe. Although the Catholic Church in Mexico has attacked the devotion of Saint Death as a tradition that mixes paganism with Christianity and is contrary to the Christian belief of Christ defeating death, many devotees consider the veneration of San La Muerte as being part of their Catholic faith. The rituals connected and powers ascribed to San La Muerte are very similar to those of Santa Muerte; the resemblance between their names, however, is coincidental.

In Aztec mythology, Mictlāntēcutli, is the god of the dead, depicted as a  skeleton or a person wearing a toothy skull.

In Guatemala, San Pascualito is a skeletal folk saint venerated as "King of the Graveyard." He is depicted as a skeletal figure with a scythe, sometimes wearing a cape and crown. He is associated with death and the curing of diseases.

In the Brazilian religion Umbanda, the orixá Omolu personifies sickness and death as well as healing. The image of the death is also associated with Exu, lord of the crossroads, who rules cemeteries and the hour of midnight.

In Haitian Vodou, the Gede are a family of spirits that embody death and fertility. The most well-known of these spirits is Baron Samedi.

Asia

East Asia

Yama was introduced to Chinese mythology through Buddhism. In Chinese, he is known as King Yan (t , s , p Yánwáng) or Yanluo (t , s , p Yánluówáng), ruling the ten gods of the underworld Diyu. He is normally depicted wearing a Chinese judge's cap and traditional Chinese robes and appears on most forms of hell money offered in ancestor worship.

Separately, in Korean mythology, death's principal figure is the "Netherworld Emissary" Jeoseungsaja (shortened to Saja (사자)). He is depicted as a stern and ruthless bureaucrat in Yeomna's service. A psychopomp, he escorts allgood or evilfrom the land of the living to the netherworld when the time comes. One of the representative names is Ganglim (강림), the Saja who guides the soul to the entrance of the underworld. According to legend, he always carries Jeokpaeji (적패지), the list with the names of the dead written on a red cloth. When he calls the name on Jeokpaeji three times, the soul leaves the body and follows him inevitably.

The Kojiki relates that the Japanese goddess Izanami was burnt to death giving birth to the fire god Hinokagutsuchi. She then entered a realm of perpetual night called Yomi-no-Kuni. Her husband Izanagi pursued her there but discovered his wife was no longer as beautiful as before. After an argument, she promised she would take a thousand lives every day, becoming a goddess of death, as well as giving birth to the gods, Raijin and Fūjin, while dead. There are also death gods called shinigami (死神), which are closer to the Western tradition of the Grim Reaper; while common in modern Japanese arts and fiction, they were essentially absent in traditional mythology.

India

The Sanskrit word for death is mrityu (cognate with Latin mors and Lithuanian mirtis), which is often personified in Dharmic religions.

In Hindu scriptures, the lord of death is called King Yama (Yama Rāja). He is also known as the King of Karmic Justice (Dharmaraja) as one's karma at death was considered to lead to a just rebirth. Yama rides a black buffalo and carries a rope lasso to lead the soul back to his home, called Naraka, pathalloka, or Yamaloka. There are many forms of reapers, although some say there is only one who disguises himself as a small child. His agents, the Yamadutas, carry souls back to Yamalok. There, all the accounts of a person's good and bad deeds are stored and maintained by Chitragupta. The balance of these deeds allows Yama to decide where the soul should reside in its next life, following the theory of reincarnation. Yama is also mentioned in the Mahabharata as a great philosopher and devotee of the Supreme Brahman.

Western Asia

The canaan of the 12th- and 13th-century BC Levant personified death as the god Mot ( "Death"). He was considered a son of the king of the gods, El. His contest with the storm god Baʿal forms part of the myth cycle from the Ugaritic texts. The Phoenicians also worshipped death under the name Mot and a version of Mot later became Maweth, the devil or angel of death in Judaism.

Europe

Baltic

Latvians named Death Veļu māte, but for Lithuanians it was Giltinė, deriving from the word gelti ("to sting"). Giltinė was viewed as an old, ugly woman with a long blue nose and a deadly poisonous tongue. The legend tells that Giltinė was young, pretty, and communicative until she was trapped in a coffin for seven years. Her sister was the goddess of life and destiny, Laima, symbolizing the relationship between beginning and end.

Like the Scandinavians, Lithuanians and Latvians later began using Grim Reaper imagery for death.

Celtic

In Breton folklore, a spectral figure called the Ankou (or Angau in Welsh) portends death. Usually, the Ankou is the spirit of the last person that died within the community and appears as a tall, haggard figure with a wide hat and long white hair or a skeleton with a revolving head. The Ankou drives a deathly wagon or cart with a creaking axle. The cart or wagon is piled high with corpses and a stop at a cabin means instant death for those inside.

Irish mythology features a similar creature known as a dullahan, whose head would be tucked under their arm (dullahans were not one, but an entire species). The head was said to have large eyes and a smile that could reach the head's ears. The dullahan would ride a black horse or a carriage pulled by black horses, and stop at the house of someone about to die, and call their name, and immediately the person would die. The dullahan did not like being watched, and it was believed that if a dullahan knew someone was watching them, they would lash that person's eyes with their whip, which was made from a spine; or they would toss a basin of blood on the person, which was a sign that the person was next to die.

Gaelic lore also involves a female spirit known as Banshee (Modern Irish Gaelic: bean sí pron. banshee, literally fairy woman), who heralds the death of a person by shrieking or keening. The banshee is often described as wearing red or green, usually with long, disheveled hair. She can appear in a variety of forms, typically that of an ugly, frightful hag, but in some stories she chooses to appear young and beautiful. Some tales recount that the creature was actually a ghost, often of a specific murdered woman or a mother who died in childbirth. When several banshees appeared at once, it was said to indicate the death of someone great or holy. In Ireland and parts of Scotland, a traditional part of mourning is the keening woman (bean chaointe), who wails a lament – in Irish: Caoineadh, caoin meaning "to weep, to wail."

In Scottish folklore there was a belief that a black, dark green or white dog known as a Cù Sìth took dying souls to the afterlife. Comparable figures exist in Irish and Welsh stories.

In Welsh Folklore, Gwyn ap Nudd is the escort of the grave, the personification of Death and Winter who leads the Wild Hunt to collect wayward souls and escort them to the Otherworld, sometimes it is Maleagant, Arawn or Afallach in a similar position.

Hellenic
In Ancient Greek religion and Greek mythology, Death (Thanatos) is one of the twin sons of Nyx (night). Like her, he is seldom portrayed directly. He sometimes appears in art as a winged and bearded man, and occasionally as a winged and beardless youth. When he appears together with his twin brother, Hypnos, the god of sleep, Thanatos generally represents a gentle death. Thanatos, led by Hermes psychopompos, takes the shade of the deceased to the near shore of the river Styx, whence the ferryman Charon, on payment of a small fee, conveys the shade to Hades, the realm of the dead. Homer's Iliad 16.681, and the Euphronios Krater's depiction of the same episode, have Apollo instruct the removal of the heroic, semi-divine Sarpedon's body from the battlefield by Hypnos and Thanatos, and conveyed thence to his homeland for proper funeral rites. Among the other children of Nyx are Thanatos' sisters, the Keres, blood-drinking, vengeant spirits of violent or untimely death, portrayed as fanged and taloned, with bloody garments.

Scandinavia

In Scandinavia, Norse mythology personified death in the shape of Hel, the goddess of death and ruler over the realm of the same name, where she received a portion of the dead. In the times of the Black Plague, Death would often be depicted as an old woman known by the name of Pesta, meaning "plague hag", wearing a black hood. She would go into a town carrying either a rake or a broom. If she brought the rake, some people would survive the plague; if she brought the broom, however, everyone would die.

Scandinavians later adopted the Grim Reaper with a scythe and black robe. Today, Ingmar Bergman's 1957 film The Seventh Seal features one of the world's most famous representations of this personification of Death.

Slavic

In Poland, Death – Śmierć or kostuch – has an appearance similar to the Grim Reaper, although its robe was traditionally white instead of black. Because the word śmierć is feminine in gender, death is frequently portrayed as a skeletal old woman, as depicted in 15th-century dialogue "Rozmowa Mistrza Polikarpa ze Śmiercią" (Latin: "Dialogus inter Mortem et Magistrum Polikarpum").

In Serbia and other South Slavic countries, the Grim Reaper is well known as Smrt ("Death") or Kosač ("Reaper"). Slavic people found this very similar to the Devil and other dark powers. One popular saying about death is: Smrt ne bira ni vreme, ni mesto, ni godinu ("Death does not choose a time, place or year" – which means death is destiny.)

Morana is a Slavic goddess of winter time, death and rebirth. A figurine of the same name is traditionally created at the end of winter/beginning of spring and symbolically taken away from villages to be set in fire and/or thrown into a river, that takes her away from the world of the living.

In the Czech Republic, the medieval Prague Astronomical Clock carries a depiction of Death striking the hour. A version first appeared in 1490.

The Low Countries
In the Netherlands, and to a lesser extent in Belgium, the personification of Death is known as Magere Hein ("Thin Hein") or Pietje de Dood ("Peter the Death"). Historically, he was sometimes simply referred to as Hein or variations thereof such as Heintje, Heintjeman and Oom Hendrik ("Uncle Hendrik"). Related archaic terms are Beenderman ("Bone-man"), Scherminkel (very meager person, "skeleton") and Maaijeman ("mow-man", a reference to his scythe).

The concept of Magere Hein predates Christianity, but was Christianized and likely gained its modern name and features (scythe, skeleton, black robe etc.) during the Middle Ages. The designation "Meager" comes from its portrayal as a skeleton, which was largely influenced by the Christian "Dance of Death" (Dutch: dodendans) theme that was prominent in Europe during the late Middle Ages. "Hein" was a Middle Dutch name originating as a short form of Heinric (see Henry (given name)). Its use was possibly related to the comparable German concept of "Freund Hein." Notably, many of the names given to Death can also refer to the Devil; it is likely that fear of death led to Hein's character being merged with that of Satan.

In Belgium, this personification of Death is now commonly called Pietje de Dood "Little Pete, the Death." Like the other Dutch names, it can also refer to the Devil.

Western Europe
In Western Europe, Death has commonly been personified as an animated skeleton since the Middle Ages. This character, which is often depicted wielding a scythe, is said to collect the souls of the dying or recently dead. In English and German culture, Death is typically portrayed as male, but in French, Spanish, and Italian culture, it is not uncommon for Death to be female.

In England, the personified "Death" featured in medieval morality plays, later regularly appearing in traditional folk songs. The following is a verse of "Death and the Lady" (Roud 1031) as sung by Henry Burstow in the nineteenth century:In the late 1800s, the character of Death became known as the Grim Reaper in English literature. The earliest appearance of the name "Grim Reaper" in English is in the 1847 book The Circle of Human Life:

In Abrahamic religions

The "Angel of the Lord" smites 185,000 men in the Assyrian camp (II Kings 19:35). When the Angel of Death passes through to smite the Egyptian first-born, God prevents "the destroyer" (shâchath) from entering houses with blood on the lintel and side posts (Exodus 12:23). The "destroying angel" (mal'ak ha-mashḥit) rages among the people in Jerusalem (II Sam. 24:16). In I Chronicles 21:15 the "angel of the Lord" is seen by King David standing "between the earth and the heaven, having a drawn sword in his hand stretched out over Jerusalem." The biblical Book of Job (33:22) uses the general term "destroyers" (memitim), which tradition has identified with "destroying angels" (mal'ake Khabbalah), and Prov. 16:14 uses the term the "angels of death" (mal'ake ha-mavet). The angel Azra'il is sometimes referred as the Angel of Death as well.

Jewish tradition also refers to Death as the Angel of Dark and Light, a name which stems from Talmudic lore. There is also a reference to "Abaddon" (The Destroyer), an angel who is known as the "Angel of the Abyss". In Talmudic lore, he is characterized as archangel Michael.

In Judaism

In Hebrew scriptures, Death ("Maweth/Mavet(h)") is sometimes personified as a devil or angel of death (e.g.,). In both the Book of Hosea and the Book of Jeremiah, Maweth/Mot is mentioned as a deity to whom Yahweh can turn over Judah as punishment for worshiping other gods. The memitim are a type of angel from biblical lore associated with the mediation over the lives of the dying. The name is derived from the Hebrew word mĕmītǐm (מְמִיתִים – "executioners", "slayers", "destroyers") and refers to angels that brought about the destruction of those whom the guardian angels no longer protected. While there may be some debate among religious scholars regarding the exact nature of the memitim, it is generally accepted that, as described in the Book of Job 33:22, they are killers of some sort.

Form and functions
According to the Midrash, the Angel of Death was created by God on the first day. His dwelling is in heaven, whence he reaches earth in eight flights, whereas Pestilence reaches it in one. He has twelve wings. "Over all people have I surrendered thee the power," said God to the Angel of Death, "only not over this one [i.e. Moses] which has received freedom from death through the Law." It is said of the Angel of Death that he is full of eyes. In the hour of death, he stands at the head of the departing one with a drawn sword, to which clings a drop of gall. As soon as the dying man sees Death, he is seized with a convulsion and opens his mouth, whereupon Death throws the drop into it. This drop causes his death; he turns putrid, and his face becomes yellow. The expression "the taste of death" originated in the idea that death was caused by a drop of gall.

The soul escapes through the mouth, or, as is stated in another place, through the throat; therefore, the Angel of Death stands at the head of the patient (Adolf Jellinek, l.c. ii. 94, Midr. Teh. to Ps. xi.). When the soul forsakes the body, its voice goes from one end of the world to the other, but is not heard (Gen. R. vi. 7; Ex. R. v. 9; Pirḳe R. El. xxxiv.). The drawn sword of the Angel of Death, mentioned by the Chronicler (I. Chron. 21:15; comp. Job 15:22; Enoch 62:11), indicates that the Angel of Death was figured as a warrior who kills off the children of men. "Man, on the day of his death, falls down before the Angel of Death like a beast before the slaughterer" (Grünhut, "Liḳḳuṭim", v. 102a). R. Samuel's father (c. 200) said: "The Angel of Death said to me, 'Only for the sake of the honor of mankind do I not tear off their necks as is done to slaughtered beasts'" ('Ab. Zarah 20b). In later representations, the knife sometimes replaces the sword, and reference is also made to the cord of the Angel of Death, which indicates death by throttling. Moses says to God: "I fear the cord of the Angel of Death" (Grünhut, l.c. v. 103a et seq.). Of the four Jewish methods of execution, three are named in connection with the Angel of Death: Burning (by pouring hot lead down the victim's throat), slaughtering (by beheading), and throttling. The Angel of Death administers the particular punishment that God has ordained for the commission of sin.

A peculiar mantle ("idra" – according to Levy, "Neuhebr. Wörterb." i. 32, a sword) belongs to the equipment of the Angel of Death (Eccl. R. iv. 7). The Angel of Death takes on the particular form which will best serve his purpose; e.g., he appears to a scholar in the form of a beggar imploring pity (the beggar should receive Tzedakah)(M. Ḳ. 28a). "When pestilence rages in the town, walk not in the middle of the street, because the Angel of Death [i.e., pestilence] strides there; if peace reigns in the town, walk not on the edges of the road. When pestilence rages in the town, go not alone to the synagogue, because there the Angel of Death stores his tools. If the dogs howl, the Angel of Death has entered the city; if they make sport, the prophet Elijah has come" (B. Ḳ. 60b). The "destroyer" (saṭan ha-mashḥit) in the daily prayer is the Angel of Death (Ber. 16b). Midr. Ma'ase Torah (compare Jellinek, "B. H." ii. 98) says: "There are six Angels of Death: Gabriel over kings; Ḳapẓiel over youths; Mashbir over animals; Mashḥit over children; Af and Ḥemah over man and beast."

Samael is considered in Talmudic texts to be a member of the heavenly host with often grim and destructive duties. One of Samael's greatest roles in Jewish lore is that of the main angel of death and the head of satans.

Scholars and the Angel of Death

Talmud teachers of the 4th century associate quite familiarly with him. When he appeared to one on the street, the teacher reproached him with rushing upon him as upon a beast, whereupon the angel called upon him at his house. To another, he granted a respite of thirty days, that he might put his knowledge in order before entering the next world. To a third, he had no access, because he could not interrupt the study of the Talmud. To a fourth, he showed a rod of fire, whereby he is recognized as the Angel of Death (M. K. 28a). He often entered the house of Bibi and conversed with him (Ḥag. 4b). Often, he resorts to strategy in order to interrupt and seize his victim (B. M. 86a; Mak. 10a).

The death of Joshua ben Levi in particular is surrounded with a web of fable. When the time came for him to die and the Angel of Death appeared to him, he demanded to be shown his place in paradise. When the angel had consented to this, he demanded the angel's knife, that the angel might not frighten him by the way. This request also was granted him, and Joshua sprang with the knife over the wall of paradise; the angel, who is not allowed to enter paradise, caught hold of the end of his garment. Joshua swore that he would not come out, and God declared that he should not leave paradise unless he had ever absolved himself of an oath; he had never absolved himself of an oath so he was allowed to remain. The Angel of Death then demanded back his knife, but Joshua refused. At this point, a heavenly voice (bat ḳol) rang out: "Give him back the knife, because the children of men have need of it will bring death." Hesitant, Joshua Ben Levi gives back the knife in exchange for the Angel of Death's name. To never forget the name, he carved Troke into his arm, the Angel of Death's chosen name. When the knife was returned to the Angel, Joshua's carving of the name faded, and he forgot.
(Ket. 77b; Jellinek, l.c. ii. 48–51; Bacher, l.c. i. 192 et seq.).

Rabbinic views
The Rabbis found the Angel of Death mentioned in Psalm 89:48, where the Targum translates: "There is no man who lives and, seeing the Angel of Death, can deliver his soul from his hand." Eccl. 8:4 is thus explained in Midrash Rabbah to the passage: "One may not escape the Angel of Death, nor say to him, 'Wait until I put my affairs in order,' or 'There is my son, my slave: take him in my stead.'" Where the Angel of Death appears, there is no remedy, but his name (Talmud, Ned. 49a; Hul. 7b). If one who has sinned has confessed his fault, the Angel of Death may not touch him (Midrash Tanhuma, ed. Buber, 139). God protects from the Angel of Death (Midrash Genesis Rabbah lxviii.).

By acts of benevolence, the anger of the Angel of Death is overcome; when one fails to perform such acts the Angel of Death will make his appearance (Derek Ereẓ Zuṭa, viii.). The Angel of Death receives his orders from God (Ber. 62b). As soon as he has received permission to destroy, however, he makes no distinction between good and bad (B. Ḳ. 60a). In the city of Luz, the Angel of Death has no power, and, when the aged inhabitants are ready to die, they go outside the city (Soṭah 46b; compare Sanh. 97a). A legend to the same effect existed in Ireland in the Middle Ages (Jew. Quart. Rev. vi. 336).

In Christianity

Death is one of the Four Horsemen of the Apocalypse portrayed in the Book of Revelation, in Revelation 6:7–8.

He is also known as the Pale Horseman whose name is Thanatos, the same as that of the ancient Greek personification of death, and the only one of the horsemen to be named.

In some versions, both arms of this verse are addressed to death.

The Christian scriptures contain the first known depiction of Abaddon as an individual entity instead of a place.

In  the devil "holds the power of death."

The Grim Reaper, is stated to be destroyed by the Lake of Fire that burns with sulfur.

In Islam
In Islam, Archangel Azrael is the Malak al-Maut (angel of death). He and his many subordinates pull the souls out of the bodies, and guide them through the journey of the afterlife. Their appearance depends on the person's deed and actions, with those that did good seeing a beautiful being, and those that did wrong seeing a horrific monster.

Islamic tradition discusses elaborately as to what exactly happens before, during, and after the death. The angel of death appears to the dying to take out their souls. The sinners' souls are extracted in a most painful way while the righteous are treated easily. After the burial, two angels – Munkar and Nakir – come to question the dead in order to test their faith. The righteous believers answer correctly and live in peace and comfort while the sinners and disbelievers fail and punishments ensue. The time period or stage between death and resurrection is called barzakh (the interregnum).

Death is a significant event in Islamic life and theology. It is seen not as the termination of life, rather the continuation of life in another form. In Islamic belief, God has made this worldly life as a test and a preparation ground for the afterlife; and with death, this worldly life comes to an end. Thus, every person has only one chance to prepare themselves for the life to come where God will resurrect and judge every individual and will entitle them to rewards or punishment, based on their good or bad deeds. And death is seen as the gateway to and beginning of the afterlife. In Islamic belief, death is predetermined by God, and the exact time of a person's death is known only to God.

Media

Songs

"Death Don't Have No Mercy" 

The 1960 gospel blues song "Death Don't Have No Mercy", composed and first recorded by Blind Gary Davis, portrays death as an inevitable and periodic visitor. According to the musicologist David Malvinni, it "presents a terrifying personification of the instant, sudden possibility [of] death at any moment that could have come from the medieval era's confrontation with the plague".

"(Don't Fear) The Reaper" 

The 1976 Blue Öyster Cult song "(Don't Fear) The Reaper", recorded for their album Agents of Fortune, alludes to the Grim Reaper in the title and lyrics. The song encourages the audience not to fear death, but rather to think of it as something that immortalizes love.

"Creeping Death" 

The 1984 thrash metal song "Creeping Death", recorded by Metallica, references the angel of death, among other religious symbols. It is described by the writer Tom King as "a tale of righteous Biblical rage and devastation straight out of the Book of Revelations".

Books

Death (Death with Interruptions or Death at Intervals) 

Nobel laureate José Saramago's novel features an anthropomorphised death as its main character, who insists that her name be written lowercase. She is depicted as a skeleton who can shapeshift and be omnipresent and has a scythe, though she doesn't always carry it. Her jurisdiction is limited to the imaginary country where the story happens and to the human species. It is implied that other deaths with jurisdiction over different life forms and territories exist, as well as an overarching death and/or god. The book deals with how society relates to death, both as a phenomenon and a character, and likewise how death relates to the people she is meant to kill and with loneliness and love.

Death (Discworld) 

Death is a fictional character in Terry Pratchett's Discworld series, and depicted as one of many Deaths. His jurisdiction is specifically the Discworld itself; he is only a part, or minion, of Azrael, the universal Death. Death has appeared in every Discworld novel, with the exception of The Wee Free Men and Snuff. Mort, published in 1987, is the first time Death appears as a leading character.

Death (The Book Thief) 

Death is the narrator of Markus Zusak's 2005 novel The Book Thief. He is a collector of deceased souls in the story. He tells the coming of age story about a girl he witnessed living in Nazi Germany and surviving World War II.

Death (Harry Potter) 

Death appears in "The Tale of Three Brothers" in J.K. Rowling's The Tales of Beedle the Bard, a collection of fairytales featured in her Harry Potter series. Three brothers avoid Death and Death, furious at being avoided, offers the brothers gifts. Two of these gifts, the Elder Wand and the Resurrection Stone lead to the first two brothers' deaths. The third brother, gifted with the Invisibility Cloak avoids Death until old age, where he then goes with Death like an old friend. These gifts became the Deathly Hallows.

Death (Incarnations of Immortality) 

Death is a held office in Piers Anthony's 1983 novel On a Pale Horse. The character Zane becomes Death after a suicide attempt that ends up killing the previous Death. He is taught by his fellow Incarnations Time and Fate and must defeat the Incarnation of Evil, Satan. He is given several items to aid him on his job, including a watch to stop local time, jewels to measure how much good and evil is in a person for judgment, and his pale horse Mortis, who often takes the form of a pale car. Zane as Death appears in Anthony's following novels, notably Bearing an Hourglass.

Charlie Asher (A Dirty Job) 

Death is a career in Christopher Moore's A Dirty Job. Charlie Asher is chosen to be a "Death Merchant" for retrieving souls and protect them from dark forces while managing his story and raising his newborn daughter.

Comics

Death (DC Comics) 

Death first appeared in The Sandman vol. 2, #8 (August 1989), and was created by Neil Gaiman and Mike Dringenberg. She is both an embodiment of death and a psychopomp in The Sandman Universe, and depicted as a down to earth, perky, and nurturing figure. Death is the second born of The Endless and she states "When the last living thing dies, my job will be finished. I'll put the chairs on the tables, turn out the lights and lock the universe behind me when I leave."

Death also appears briefly in Fables #11 (May 2003) titled "Bag O' Bones", where Jack Horner traps Death in a magical bag that never gets full. There has been no indication as to whether Fables has any connection to the Sandman universe.

Death (Marvel Comics) 

The character first appeared in Captain Marvel #26 (Jun. 1973) and was created by Mike Friedrich and Jim Starlin. Death is an abstract entity, the embodiment of the end of life in the Marvel Universe, and resides inside a pocket dimension known as the Realm of Death. The character can change appearance at will shown in a storyline of Captain Marvel where Thanos' scheme to conquer the universe, as the character becomes determined to prove his love for Death by destroying all life. However, she is commonly seen in a relationship with Deadpool.

Lady MacDeath (Bug-a-Boo) 

Lady MacDeath is a Grim Reaper, the personification of Death who is responsible of going after all people whose time to die has come, although unlike a typical Grim Reaper, her body is not pictured as made of bones. She uses her sickle to kill people, by hitting them in the head, and then she takes their souls to the purgatory, for them to be judged and sent whether to hell or heaven (sometimes after much bureaucracy). She always carries a list with the name of the people she must kill on the day. Most of her stories feature a pursuit, sometimes punctuated with struggles faced every day by normal people. Maurício de Souza says that the purpose of creating her is "taking death less seriously, while it doesn't come to us".

Film

Death Takes a Holiday (1934) 

After years of questioning why people fear him, Death takes on human form for three days so that he can mingle among mortals and find an answer. He finds a host in Duke Lambert after revealing himself and his intentions to the Duke, and takes up temporary residence in the Duke's villa. However, events soon spiral out of control as Death falls in love with the beautiful young Grazia. As he does so, Duke Lambert, the father of Grazia's mortal lover Corrado, begs him to give Grazia up and leave her among the living. Death must decide whether to seek his own happiness, or sacrifice it so that Grazia may live.

The 1998 American film Meet Joe Black is loosely based on the 1934 film. While on Earth, Death, living under the name Joe Black, enlists the wealthy Bill Parrish to be his guide to mortal life, and in exchange guarantees that Bill will not die as long as he serves as "Joe's" guide. Joe falls in love with Bill's youngest daughter, Susan, a resident in internal medicine, and learns the meaning of both friendship and love.

The Seventh Seal (1957) 

Death is one of the main characters in 1957 Swedish historical fantasy film The Seventh Seal. The film tells the story of a knight encountering Death, whom he challenges to a chess match, believing he can survive as long as the game continues.

These scenes are parodied in the 1991 comedy film Bill & Ted's Bogus Journey, in which the title characters repeatedly beat Death playing a variety of family board games such as Battleship and Twister. Death goes on to accompany Bill and Ted for the remainder of the film as a major supporting character. The scene from "The Seventh Seal" is also parodied in a one-act play by Woody Allen called "Death," in which the personification of death agrees to play gin rummy and loses badly, altering his plans to "take" his opponent.

The Adventures of Baron Munchausen (1988) 

Throughout the film, Munchausen is pursued by Death, a skeletal angel with raven's wings, carrying a scythe in one hand and an hourglass in the other. At the end, Death, in the form of a grim physician, extracts Munchausen's glowing life force, and Munchausen is given a lavish funeral before boldly claiming it was "one of the many times I faced Death."

Final Destination film series (2000–2011) 

In each of the Final Destination films, one of the protagonists experiences a premonition of an impending disaster. When these visions come true, the protagonists manage to avoid harm, though many innocent people are killed. Their escapes alter the design intended by Death, which – while never portrayed as a physical entity – is described as an omniscient supernatural force. In each film, the characters learn that they can never truly escape from death, and that they are each doomed to be killed one by one.

Guillermo del Toro's Pinocchio (2022) 

In this film, Death (voiced by Tilda Swinton) resides in the afterlife. She is the sister of the Wood Sprite and is depicted as a Chimera.

Puss in Boots: The Last Wish (2022) 

Throughout the events of the film, the titular Puss in Boots is pursued by the terrifying black-cloaked Wolf (voiced by Wagner Moura), who wields twin sickles and announces his foreboding presence with haunting whistling. His sighting consistently evokes terror in the cat, following their first meeting in which Puss lost his sword to him and was wounded by a blade for the first time. Eventually, Wolf confronts Puss once again and reveals himself as the personification of Death. He states his disgust and anger at Puss's lack of respect for the concept of death and lack of value placed on his previous eight lives, as well as his intent to kill Puss once and for all. However, though he manages to partially disarm Death during their final duel, Puss acknowledges that he knows that he can never truly defeat him. Though Death is initially frustrated, he appreciates Puss's growth in character and tells him to live his last life well and departs as a new respect forged between them.

Television 
In 1987, the Australian government produced a controversial commercial featuring the Grim Reaper in order to raise public awareness about the danger of HIV/AIDS.

The Grim Reaper is one of the main characters of the 2000s Cartoon Network series The Grim Adventures of Billy & Mandy, where he is usually referred to as Grim and is voiced by Greg Eagles.

The Grim Reaper ("Death") appears in some early episodes of Family Guy as a character voiced by Norm Macdonald in the first appearance and by Adam Carolla in later appearances.

The Showtime television series Dead Like Me features a small team of characters taking the role of the "grim reaper", removing the souls of people just prior to their imminent death. Unlike most depictions of Death, the show depicted "grim reaper" as a job title, held by multiple people at once. 

In the British children's sketch television show Horrible Histories, Death (portaryed by Simon Farnaby) is a reoccurring character who appears the segment "Stupid Deaths" and later in its sixth series "Chatty Deaths".

Theatre

Elisabeth Viennese musical (1992) 

The personification of Death or the Grim Reaper is the leading male role in the 1992 Viennese musical, depicting the titular Empress of Austria-Hungary's fictionalised life and her entanglements and obsession with Death. Portrayals of Death varies between productions from androgynous to masculine, dressed at various times in all black or all white.

Video Games 
The personification of Death appears many times in many different games, especially Castlevania and The Sims. Nearly all iterations of a "Death" or "Grim Reaper" character feature most of the same characteristics seen in other media and pop culture: a skeleton wearing a cloak and wielding a scythe. Darksiders II has Death as the player character.

League of Legends focuses on the concept of Kindred, a personification of death consisting of a duo of lamb and wolf.

Gallery

See also
 Anthropomorphism
 Danse Macabre
 Davy Jones's locker
 Death and the Maiden
 Death (Tarot card)
 List of death deities
 Shinigami
 Skeleton (undead)
Skeleton
 Skull art
 Veneration of the dead

Notes

Bibliography
 
 
 
 Cantu, Dean (March 2018). "Memento Mori: The Personification of Death." TEDxTalk, University of Tulsa. https://www.youtube.com/watch?v=lvnnqRy6ctI

External links
 
 Korea National Encyclopedia of Ethnic Practices 
 Collection: "Death Personified" from the University of Michigan Museum of Art



 
Fictional humanoids
Supernatural legends
Psychopomps
Undead